Differential Global Positioning Systems (DGPSs) supplement and enhance the positional data available from global navigation satellite systems (GNSSs).

DGPSs consist of networks of fixed position, ground-based reference stations. Each reference station calculates the difference between its highly accurate known position and its less accurate satellite-derived position. The stations broadcast this data locally—typically using ground-based transmitters of shorter range. Non-fixed (mobile) receivers use it to correct their position by the same amount, thereby improving their accuracy.

The USCG's DGPS was named NDGPS (Nationwide DGPS) and was jointly administered by the Coast Guard and the U.S. Department of Defense's Army Corps of Engineers (USACE). It consisted of broadcast sites located throughout the inland and coastal portions of the United States including Alaska, Hawaii and Puerto Rico. Other countries have their own DGPS.

A similar system which transmits corrections from orbiting satellites instead of ground-based transmitters is called a Wide-Area DGPS (WADGPS) Satellite Based Augmentation System.

History
When GPS was first being put into service, the US military was concerned about the possibility of enemy forces using the globally available GPS signals to guide their own weapon systems. This technique, known as Selective Availability, or SA for short, seriously degraded the usefulness of the GPS signal for non-military users. More accurate guidance was possible for users of dual-frequency GPS receivers which also received the L2 frequency, but the L2 transmission, intended for military use, was encrypted and was available only to authorized users with the decryption keys.

This presented a problem for civilian users who relied upon ground-based radio navigation systems such as LORAN, VOR and NDB systems costing millions of dollars each year to maintain. The advent of a global navigation satellite system (GNSS) could provide greatly improved accuracy and performance at a fraction of the cost. The accuracy inherent in the S/A signal was however too poor to make this realistic. The military received multiple requests from the Federal Aviation Administration (FAA), United States Coast Guard (USCG) and United States Department of Transportation (DOT) to set S/A aside to enable civilian use of GNSS, but remained steadfast in its objection on grounds of security.

Through the early to mid 1980s, a number of agencies developed a solution to the SA "problem". Since the SA signal was changed slowly, the effect of its offset on positioning was relatively fixed – that is, if the offset was "100 meters to the east", that offset would be true over a relatively wide area. Additionally, another major source of errors in a GPS fix is due to transmission delays in the ionosphere, which could also be measured and corrected for in the broadcast. This offered an improvement to about   accuracy, more than enough for most civilian needs.

The US Coast Guard was one of the more aggressive proponents of the DGPS, experimenting with the system on an ever-wider basis through the late 1980s and early 1990s. These signals are broadcast on marine longwave frequencies, which could be received on existing radiotelephones and fed into suitably equipped GPS receivers. Almost all major GPS vendors offered units with DGPS inputs, not only for the USCG signals, but also aviation units on either VHF or commercial AM radio bands.

"Production quality" DGPS signals began to be sent out on a limited basis in 1996, and the network was rapidly expanded to cover most US ports of call, as well as the Saint Lawrence Seaway in partnership with the Canadian Coast Guard. Plans were put into place to expand the system across the US, but this would not be easy. The quality of the DGPS corrections generally fell with distance, and large transmitters capable of covering large areas tend to cluster near cities. This meant that lower-population areas, notably in the midwest and Alaska, would have little coverage by ground-based GPS. As of November 2013 the USCG's national DGPS consisted of 85 broadcast sites which provide dual coverage to almost the entire US coastline and inland navigable waterways including Alaska, Hawaii, and Puerto Rico. In addition the system provided single or dual coverage to a majority of the inland portion of United States. Instead, the FAA (and others) started studying broadcasting the signals across the entire hemisphere from communications satellites in geostationary orbit. This led to the Wide Area Augmentation System (WAAS) and similar systems, although these are generally not referred to as DGPS, or alternatively, "wide-area DGPS". WAAS offers accuracy similar to the USCG's ground-based DGPS networks, and there has been some argument that the latter will be turned off as WAAS becomes fully operational.

By the mid-1990s it was clear that the SA system was no longer useful in its intended role. DGPS would render it ineffective over the US, where it was considered most needed. Additionally, during the Gulf War of 1990-1991 SA had been temporarily turned off because Allied troops were using commercial GPS receivers. This showed that leaving SA turned off could be useful to the United States. In 2000, an executive order by President Bill Clinton turned it off permanently.

Nevertheless, by this point DGPS had evolved into a system for providing more accuracy than even a non-SA GPS signal could provide on its own. There are several other sources of error which share the same characteristics as SA in that they are the same over large areas and for "reasonable" amounts of time. These include the ionospheric effects mentioned earlier, as well as errors in the satellite position ephemeris data and clock drift on the satellites. Depending on the amount of data being sent in the DGPS correction signal, correcting for these effects can reduce the error significantly, the best implementations offering accuracies of under .

In addition to continued deployments of the USCG and FAA sponsored systems, a number of vendors have created commercial DGPS services, selling their signal (or receivers for it) to users who require better accuracy than the nominal 15 meters GPS offers. Almost all commercial GPS units, even hand-held units, now offer DGPS data inputs, and many also support WAAS directly. To some degree, a form of DGPS is now a natural part of most GPS operations.

Operation

A reference station calculates differential corrections for its own location and time. Users may be up to 200 nautical miles (370 km) from the station, however, and some of the compensated errors vary with space: specifically, satellite ephemeris errors and those introduced by ionospheric and tropospheric distortions. For this reason, the accuracy of DGPS decreases with distance from the reference station. The problem can be aggravated if the user and the station lack "inter visibility"—when they are unable to see the same satellites.

Accuracy
 but measurements of accuracy across the Atlantic, in Portugal, suggest a degradation of just .

Variations
DGPS can refer to any type of Ground-Based Augmentation System (GBAS). There are many operational systems in use throughout the world, according to the US Coast Guard, 47 countries operate systems similar to the US NDGPS (Nationwide Differential Global Positioning System). A list can be found at the World DGPS Database for Dxers.

European DGPS Network
European DGPS network has been developed mainly by the Finnish and Swedish maritime administrations in order to improve safety in the archipelago between the two countries.

In the UK and Ireland, the system was implemented as a maritime navigation aid to fill the gap left by the demise of the Decca Navigator System in 2000. With a network of 12 transmitters sited around the coastline and three control stations, it was set up in 1998 by the countries' respective General Lighthouse Authorities (GLA) — Trinity House covering England, Wales and the Channel Islands, the Northern Lighthouse Board covering Scotland and the Isle of Man and the Commissioners of Irish Lights, covering the whole of Ireland. Transmitting on the 300-kHz band, the system underwent testing and two additional transmitters were added before the system was declared operational in 2002.

Effective Solutions provides details and a map of European Differential Beacon Transmitters.

United States NDGPS
The United States Department of Transportation, in conjunction with the Federal Highway Administration, the Federal Railroad Administration and the National Geodetic Survey appointed the Coast Guard as the maintaining agency for the U.S. Nationwide DGPS network (NDGPS). The system is an expansion of the previous Maritime Differential GPS (MDGPS), which the Coast Guard began in the late 1980s and completed in March 1999. MDGPS covered only coastal waters, the Great Lakes, and the Mississippi River inland waterways, while NDGPS expands this to include complete coverage of the continental United States. The centralized Command and Control unit is the USCG Navigation Center, based in Alexandria, VA. There are currently 85 NDGPS sites in the US network, administered by the U.S. Department of Homeland Security Navigation Center.

In 2015, the USCG  and the United States Army Corps of Engineers (USACE) sought comments on a planned phasing-out of the U.S. DGPS. In response to the comments received, a subsequent 2016 Federal Register notice announced that 46 stations would remain in service and "available to users in the maritime and coastal regions". In spite of this decision, USACE decommissioned its remaining 7 sites and, in March 2018, the USCG announced that it would decommission its remaining stations by 2020. As of June 2020, all NDGPS service has been discontinued as it is no longer deemed a necessity owing to the removal of selective availability in 2000 and also the introduction of newer generation of GPS satellites.

Canadian DGPS
The Canadian system is similar to the US system and is primarily for maritime usage covering the Atlantic and Pacific coast as well as the Great Lakes and Saint Lawrence Seaway. It has been discontinued as a service since December 15, 2022.

Australia
Australia runs three DGPSes: one is mainly for marine navigation, broadcasting its signal on the long-wave band; another is used for land surveys and land navigation, and has corrections broadcast on the Commercial FM radio band. The third at Sydney airport is currently undergoing testing for precision landing of aircraft (2011), as a backup to the Instrument Landing System at least until 2015. It is called the Ground Based Augmentation System. Corrections to aircraft position are broadcast via the aviation VHF band.

The marine DGPS service of 16 Ground stations covering the Australian coast was discontinued from 1 July 2020. Improved multichannel GPS capabilities, and signal sources from multiple providers (GPS, GLONASS, Galileo and BeiDou) was cited as providing better navigational accuracy than could be obtained from GPS + DGPS. An Australian Satellite-Based Augmentation System (SBAS) project, led by Geoscience Australia (GA), will offer higher accuracy positioning for GNSS users within the next 2 – 3 years (as of September 2020).

Post processing

Post-processing is used in Differential GPS to obtain precise positions of unknown points by relating them to known points such as survey markers.

The GPS measurements are usually stored in computer memory in the GPS receivers, and are subsequently transferred to a computer running the GPS post-processing software. The software computes baselines using simultaneous measurement data from two or more GPS receivers.

The baselines represent a three-dimensional line drawn between the two points occupied by each pair of GPS antennas. The post-processed measurements allow more precise positioning, because most GPS errors affect each receiver nearly equally, and therefore can be cancelled out in the calculations.

Differential GPS measurements can also be computed in real time by some GPS receivers if they receive a correction signal using a separate radio receiver, for example in Real Time Kinematic (RTK) surveying or navigation.

The improvement of GPS positioning doesn't require simultaneous measurements of two or more receivers in any case, but can also be done by special use of a single device. In the 1990s when even handheld receivers were quite expensive, some methods of quasi-differential GPS were developed, using the receiver in quick turns of positions or loops of 3-10 survey points.

See also
RTCM SC-104 - a standard for transferring dGPS data to a GPS receiver
Assisted GPS (A-GPS) - System used primarily in GPS-equipped cellular devices to improve start-up performance
GNSS augmentation
GNSS enhancement

References

External links

 SiReNT information page 
 US NDGPS fact sheet
 USCG Navigation Center National DGPS system
 USCG coverage maps
 Canadian Coast Guard DGPS information (English)
 Canadian Coast Guard DGPS information (French)
 Product Survey on RTK DGPS receivers for (mainly) hydrographic use
 DGPS Decoding Software
 Useful DGPS Links, Databases and Resources
 Worldwide database of IALA DGPS Reference stations on an interactive map

Geomatics engineering
Global Positioning System
Wireless locating